The 2014–15 Utah Runnin' Utes men's basketball team represented the University of Utah during the 2014–15 NCAA Division I men's basketball season. They played their home games at the Jon M. Huntsman Center in Salt Lake City, Utah as members of the Pac-12 Conference. The Utes were led by fourth year head coach Larry Krystkowiak. They finished the season 26–9, 13–5 in Pac-12 play to finish in a tie for second place. They advanced to the semifinals of the Pac-12 tournament where they lost to Oregon. They received an at-large bid to the NCAA tournament where they defeated Stephen F. Austin in the second round and Georgetown in the third round to advance to the Sweet Sixteen where they lost to Duke.

Previous season
The 2013–14 Utah Utes finished the season with an overall record of 21–12, and 9–9 in the Pac–12. In the 2014 Pac–12 Tournament, the Utes defeated Washington before losing to Arizona in the quarterfinals, 39–71. The Utes received an at–large bid to the 2014 National Invitation Tournament where they were defeated by Saint Mary's in the first round.

Off-season

Departures

Incoming transfers

2014 recruiting class

Roster

Schedule

|-
!colspan=9 style="background:#CC0000; color:white;"| Exhibition

|-
!colspan=9 style="background:#CC0000; color:white;"| Non-conference regular season

|-
!colspan=9 style="background:#CC0000;"| Pac-12 regular season

|-
!colspan=9 style="background:#CC0000;"| Pac-12 tournament

|-
!colspan=12 style="background:#CC0033;"| NCAA tournament

Ranking movement

See also
2014–15 Utah Utes women's basketball team

References

Utah
Utah Utes men's basketball seasons
Utah
Utah Utes
Utah Utes